The year 1998 in film involved many significant films, including
Shakespeare in Love (which won the Academy Award for Best Picture), Saving Private Ryan, Armageddon (which was the top-grossing film of the year in the United States), American History X, The Truman Show, Primary Colors, Rushmore, Rush Hour, There's Something About Mary, The Big Lebowski, and Terrence Malick's directorial return in The Thin Red Line. DreamWorks SKG released its first two animated films: Antz and The Prince of Egypt. The Pokémon theatrical film series started with Pokémon: The First Movie. Warner Bros. Pictures celebrated its 75th anniversary.

The year saw two dueling science-fiction disaster films about asteroids, Armageddon and Deep Impact, becoming box office success, with Armageddon becoming the more popular of the two. It was also the highest-grossing film of 1998 worldwide.

Highest-grossing films

The top 10 films released in 1998 by worldwide gross are as follows:

Box office records 

 Saving Private Ryan grossed $482 million worldwide, becoming the highest grossing World War II film until it was surpassed by Dunkirk (2017). 
 Blade became the top-grossing film based on a Marvel Comics character, grossing $131.2 million worldwide at the time of its release.

Events 

 March 1 - Titanic becomes the first film to gross over $1 billion at the worldwide box office. Twenty-two days later, the film won eleven Academy Awards, including Best Picture. 
 May 8 and July 1 - 1998 saw the release of two dueling science-fiction disaster films about asteroids, Armageddon and Deep Impact, becoming box office success, with Armageddon becoming the more popular of the two and was also the highest-grossing film of 1998 worldwide.
 July 24 - Saving Private Ryan, directed by Steven Spielberg, was released to critical acclaim and was the top grossing domestic film of 1998. Winning five Academy Awards including Best Director, the film was lauded as an influential landmark in the war and action film genres, primarily due to its use of desaturated colors, hand-held cameras, and tight angles.
 August 21 - Blade, based on the character of the same name, grosses over $131.2 million worldwide. Its success would help stage future film adaptations of Marvel Comics characters. 
 December 25, Terrance Malick returned after a twenty-year hiatus with The Thin Red Line.

Awards events
 3rd Empire Awards
 56th Golden Globe Awards
 71st Academy Awards

Palme d'Or (Cannes Film Festival):

Eternity and a Day (Μια αιωνιότητα και μια μέρα, Mia aioniotita kai mia mera), directed by Theo Angelopoulos, Greece / France / Italy

Golden Lion (Venice Film Festival):

The Way We Laughed (Così ridevano), directed by Gianni Amelio, Italy

Golden Bear (Berlin Film Festival):

Central do Brasil (Central Station), directed by Walter Salles, Brazil / France

Awards

1998 films

January–March

April–June

July–September

October–December

Notable films released in 1998

United States unless stated

#
 1732 Høtten – (Norway)
 42 Up – (UK)
 54, starring Ryan Phillippe, Salma Hayek, Neve Campbell, Breckin Meyer and Mike Myers

A
 A, documentary about the Aum Shinrikyo cult – (Japan)
 Addams Family Reunion
 The Adventures of Sebastian Cole, starring Adrian Grenier
 An Affair (Jeongsa) – (South Korea)
 After Life (Wandâfuru raifu), starring Arata – (Japan)
 An Alan Smithee Film: Burn Hollywood Burn, starring Ryan O'Neal, Eric Idle, Coolio, Chuck D and Richard Jeni
 Alice and Martin, directed by André Téchiné, starring Juliette Binoche – (France)
 Almost Heroes, directed by Christopher Guest, starring Chris Farley, Matthew Perry and Eugene Levy
 American History X, directed by Tony Kaye, starring Edward Norton, Edward Furlong, Beverly D'Angelo, Elliott Gould and Stacy Keach
 An American Tail: The Treasure of Manhattan Island, direct-to-video sequel to the 1986 animated fantasy, voices of Thomas Dekker and Lacey Chabert
 Another Day in Paradise, starring James Woods and Melanie Griffith
 Antz, animated film with voices of Woody Allen, Sharon Stone, Gene Hackman, Sylvester Stallone, Jennifer Lopez and Dan Aykroyd
 Anxiety (Inquietude) – (Portugal)
 The Apple (Sib) – (Iran)
 April Story (Shigatsu monogatari) – short film starring Takako Matsu – (Japan)
 Apt Pupil, directed by Bryan Singer, starring Ian McKellen, Brad Renfro and David Schwimmer
 Armageddon, directed by Michael Bay, starring Bruce Willis, Billy Bob Thornton, Liv Tyler, Ben Affleck and Steve Buscemi
 Art Museum by the Zoo (Misulgwan yup dongmulwon), starring Shim Eun-ha – (South Korea)
 August 32nd on Earth (Un 32 août sur terre) – (Canada)
 The Avengers, starring Ralph Fiennes, Uma Thurman, Sean Connery

B
 B. Monkey, starring Asia Argento, Rupert Everett and Jared Harris – (UK/US)
 Babe: Pig in the City, directed by George Miller, starring James Cromwell, Magda Szubanski and Mickey Rooney with the voices of Elizabeth Daily and Hugo Weaving – (Australia/US)
 The Barber of Siberia (Sibirskiy tsiryulnik) – (Russia)
 BASEketball, directed by David Zucker, starring Trey Parker, Matt Stone, Yasmine Bleeth, Jenny McCarthy and Robert Vaughn
 Basil, directed by Radha Bharadwaj, starring Jared Leto, Claire Forlani and Christian Slater – (UK)
 Be There or Be Square (Bu jian bu san) – (China)
 Beast Cops (Yeshou xingjing), directed by Gordon Chan – (Hong Kong)
 Bedrooms and Hallways, starring Kevin McKidd, Hugo Weaving and James Purefoy – (UK)
 Begging for Love (Ai o kou hito) – (Japan)
 Belly, directed by Hype Williams, starring DMX
 Beloved, directed by Jonathan Demme, starring Oprah Winfrey, Danny Glover and Thandie Newton
 Beshkempir (a.k.a. Beshkempir the Adopted Son) – (Kyrgyzstan)
 Besieged (L'assedio), directed by Bernardo Bertolucci, starring Thandie Newton and David Thewlis – (Italy/UK)
 The Big Hit, starring Mark Wahlberg, Lou Diamond Phillips, Christina Applegate and Elliott Gould
 The Big Lebowski, directed by Joel and Ethan Coen, starring Jeff Bridges, John Goodman, Steve Buscemi, Julianne Moore, Peter Stormare and John Turturro
 Billy's Hollywood Screen Kiss, starring Sean Hayes
 The Bird People in China (Chûgoku no chôjin), directed by Takashi Miike – (Japan)
 Birdcage Inn (Paran daemun) – (South Korea)
 Black Cat, White Cat (Crna mačka, beli mačor) – (Yugoslavia)
 Black Dog, starring Patrick Swayze and Meat Loaf
 Blade, directed by Stephen Norrington, starring Wesley Snipes, Stephen Dorff and Kris Kristofferson
 Blues Brothers 2000, directed by John Landis, starring Dan Aykroyd, John Goodman, Joe Morton, James Brown and Aretha Franklin
 Blues Harp, directed by Takashi Miike – (Japan)
 Bombay Boys, starring Naveen Andrews – (India)
 The Boys, starring David Wenham and Toni Collette – (Australia)
 Break Up, starring Bridget Fonda, Hart Bochner and Kiefer Sutherland
 Bride of Chucky, starring Jennifer Tilly, Katherine Heigl and Nick Stabile
 Broken Vessels
 Brown's Requiem, starring Michael Rooker and Selma Blair
 Buffalo '66, directed by and starring Vincent Gallo, with Christina Ricci, Mickey Rourke, Rosanna Arquette, Ben Gazzara, and Anjelica Huston
 A Bug's Life, animated film directed by John Lasseter, with the voices of Dave Foley, Kevin Spacey, Julia Louis-Dreyfus, David Hyde Pierce, Denis Leary and Bonnie Hunt
 Bulworth, directed by and starring Warren Beatty, with Halle Berry, Don Cheadle, Oliver Platt and Paul Sorvino

C
 Can't Hardly Wait, starring Jennifer Love Hewitt and Ethan Embry
 Caresses (Caricias) – (Spain)
 Caught Up, starring Bokeem Woodbine
 The Celebration (Festen), directed by Thomas Vinterberg – (Denmark)
 Celebrity, directed by Woody Allen, starring Kenneth Branagh, Judy Davis, Leonardo DiCaprio, Melanie Griffith, Famke Janssen, Hank Azaria, Winona Ryder and Charlize Theron
 Central Station Central do Brasil – (Brazil/France) – Golden Globe Award for Best Foreign Language Film and Golden Bear award
 Chachi 420 (The Trickster Aunt), starring Kamal Haasan, Amrish Puri and Om Puri – (India)
 Christmas in August (Palwolui Christmas) – (South Korea)
 City of Angels, directed by Brad Silberling, starring Nicolas Cage, Meg Ryan and Andre Braugher
 A Civil Action, directed by Steven Zaillian, starring John Travolta, Robert Duvall, William H. Macy, Tony Shalhoub, Kathleen Quinlan, James Gandolfini and John Lithgow
 Clay Pigeons, directed by David Dobkin, starring Joaquin Phoenix, Vince Vaughn and Janeane Garofalo – (US/Germany)
 Come Sweet Death (Komm, süßer Tod) – (Austria)
 Cousin Bette, starring Jessica Lange, Elisabeth Shue, Hugh Laurie – (UK/US)
 Croupier, directed by Mike Hodges, starring Clive Owen, Alex Kingston and Gina McKee – (UK)
 The Curve, starring Matthew Lillard and Keri Russell

D
 Dance Me to My Song – (Australia)
 Dance with Me, directed by Randa Haines, starring Vanessa L. Williams, Kris Kristofferson and Jane Krakowski
 Dancer, Texas Pop. 81, starring Breckin Meyer
 Dangerous Beauty, starring Catherine McCormack, Naomi Watts, Rufus Sewell, Fred Ward
 Dark City, directed by Alex Proyas, starring Rufus Sewell, Kiefer Sutherland, Jennifer Connelly and William Hurt – (Australia/US)
 Dead Man on Campus, starring Tom Everett Scott
 Deep Impact, starring Robert Duvall, Téa Leoni, Elijah Wood, Morgan Freeman, Vanessa Redgrave and Maximilian Schell
 Deep Rising, directed by Stephen Sommers, starring Treat Williams, Famke Janssen, Wes Studi and Anthony Heald
 Desert Blue, directed by Morgan J. Freeman
 Desperate Measures, starring Michael Keaton, Andy García, Marcia Gay Harden and Brian Cox
 Detective Conan: The Fourteenth Target (aka Case Closed: the Fourteenth Target) – (Japan)
 Digging to China, starring Evan Rachel Wood and Kevin Bacon
 The Day Silence Died (El día que murió el silencio) – (Bolivia)
 Le Dîner de Cons (Dinner for Cretins), directed by Francis Veber – (France)
 Dirty Work, starring Norm Macdonald, Artie Lange, Jack Warden, Chevy Chase and Chris Farley
 Disturbing Behavior, starring James Marsden, Katie Holmes and Nick Stahl – (Australia/US)
 Divorcing Jack, starring David Thewlis – (UK)
 Down in the Delta, directed by Maya Angelou, starring Alfre Woodard, Al Freeman Jr., Esther Rolle, Loretta Devine, and Wesley Snipes
 Dr. Akagi (Kanzō-sensei), directed by Shohei Imamura – (Japan)
 Dr. Dolittle, starring Eddie Murphy, voices of Norm Macdonald, Albert Brooks, Chris Rock, Garry Shandling and Ellen DeGeneres
 The Dreamlife of Angels (La Vie rêvée des anges) – (France)

E
 Earth (अर्थ), directed by Deepa Mehta – (India)
 Elizabeth, directed by Shekhar Kapur, starring Cate Blanchett, Geoffrey Rush, Christopher Eccleston, Sir John Gielgud, Daniel Craig, Fanny Ardant, Kathy Burke and Richard Attenborough – (UK)
 Enemy of the State, directed by Tony Scott, starring Will Smith, Gene Hackman, Jon Voight, Barry Pepper, Lisa Bonet and Regina King
 Eternity and a Day (Mia aioniotita kai mia mera), starring Bruno Ganz – (Greece) – Palme d'Or award
 Ever After, starring Drew Barrymore, Anjelica Huston and Dougray Scott
 Everest, a documentary narrated by Liam Neeson

F
 The Faculty, directed by Robert Rodriguez, starring Josh Hartnett, Elijah Wood, Clea DuVall, Robert Patrick, Famke Janssen, Usher Raymond, Salma Hayek, and Jon Stewart
 Fallen, starring Denzel Washington, John Goodman, Embeth Davidtz and Donald Sutherland
 The Farm: Angola, US
 Fear and Loathing in Las Vegas, directed by Terry Gilliam, starring Johnny Depp, Benicio del Toro, Tobey Maguire, Ellen Barkin, Christina Ricci and Cameron Diaz
 Fibra óptica (Fibre Optic) – (Mexico)
 Finding Graceland, starring Harvey Keitel and Bridget Fonda
 Firestorm, starring Howie Long and Scott Glenn
 Flowers of Shanghai (hǎi shàng huā) – (Taiwan)
 Following,  written and directed by Christopher Nolan
 Foolish Heart (Corazón iluminado), directed by Héctor Babenco – (Argentina/Brazil)
 For Sale (À vendre) – (France)
 Forever Love, starring Reba McEntire and Tim Matheson
 From the Edge of the City (Apo tin akri tis polis) – (Greece)

G
 The General, directed by John Boorman, starring Brendan Gleeson and Jon Voight – (Ireland)
 Genghis Khan – (China)
 Georgica – (Estonia)
 Get Real – (UK)
 Ghulam (Slave), starring Aamir Khan – (India)
 The Gingerbread Man, directed by Robert Altman, starring Kenneth Branagh, Embeth Davidtz, Robert Downey Jr., Tom Berenger, Daryl Hannah, Famke Janssen, and Robert Duvall
 The Girl of Your Dreams (La niña de tus ojos), starring Penélope Cruz – (Spain)
 Girls' Night, starring Julie Walters, Brenda Blethyn and Kris Kristofferson – (UK)
 God said "Ha!", starring Julia Sweeney – Golden Space Needle Award
 Gods and Monsters, directed by Bill Condon starring Ian McKellen, Brendan Fraser and Lynn Redgrave – (UK/US)
 Godzilla, directed by Roland Emmerich, starring Matthew Broderick, Jean Reno, Maria Pitillo, Kevin Dunn and Hank Azaria
 Goodbye, 20th Century! (Zbogum na dvaesettiot vek!) – (Macedonia)
 Goodbye Lover, starring Patricia Arquette and Dermot Mulroney
 The Grandfather (El abuelo) – (Spain)
 Great Expectations, directed by Alfonso Cuarón, starring Ethan Hawke, Gwyneth Paltrow, Anne Bancroft, Chris Cooper and Robert De Niro
 Gunshy, starring Diane Lane and William Petersen
 Gunslinger's Revenge, starring Leonardo Pieraccioni, Harvey Keitel and David Bowie

H
 The Hairy Bird, starring Kirsten Dunst, Gaby Hoffmann, Heather Matarazzo and Lynn Redgrave – (US/Canada)
 Half Baked, starring Dave Chappelle, Jim Breuer and Guillermo Diaz
 Halloween H20: 20 Years Later, starring Jamie Lee Curtis, Adam Arkin, Michelle Williams, LL Cool J, Josh Hartnett and Janet Leigh
 Happiness, directed by Todd Solondz, starring Philip Seymour Hoffman, Jane Adams, Dylan Baker, Lara Flynn Boyle, Ben Gazzara, Louise Lasser and Jon Lovitz
 Happy Birthday (S dnyom rozhdeniya) – (Russia)
 Hard Rain, starring Christian Slater, Morgan Freeman, Minnie Driver and Randy Quaid
 He Got Game, directed by Spike Lee, starring Denzel Washington, Ray Allen, Rosario Dawson, Milla Jovovich, and John Turturro
 Head On – (Australia)
 Hercules and Xena – The Animated Movie: The Battle for Mount Olympus
 The Hi-Lo Country, directed by Stephen Frears, starring Woody Harrelson, Penélope Cruz Billy Crudup and Patricia Arquette
 Hideous Kinky, starring Kate Winslet and Saïd Taghmaoui – (UK/France)
 High Art, directed by Lisa Cholodenko, starring Ally Sheedy and Radha Mitchell
 Hilary and Jackie, directed by Anand Tucker, starring Emily Watson, Rachel Griffiths, David Morrissey and Charles Dance – (UK)
 Hold You Tight (愈快樂愈墮落), directed by Stanley Kwan – (Hong Kong)
 The Hole (Dong) – (Taiwan)
 Holy Man, starring Eddie Murphy, Jeff Goldblum and Kelly Preston
 Home Fries, starring Drew Barrymore and Luke Wilson
 Homegrown, starring Billy Bob Thornton, John Lithgow, Ryan Phillippe, Hank Azaria, Kelly Lynch and Jon Bon Jovi
 Hope Floats, directed by Forest Whitaker, starring Sandra Bullock, Harry Connick Jr. and Gena Rowlands
 The Horse Whisperer, directed by and starring Robert Redford, with Kristin Scott Thomas, Sam Neill, Scarlett Johansson
 How Stella Got Her Groove Back, starring Angela Bassett, Taye Diggs and Whoopi Goldberg
 How to Make the Cruelest Month, starring Clea DuVall
 Human Remains
 Hurlyburly, starring Sean Penn, Chazz Palminteri, Kevin Spacey, Robin Wright, Garry Shandling, Meg Ryan and Anna Paquin
 Hush, starring Gwyneth Paltrow, Jessica Lange and Johnathon Schaech
 Hyderabad Blues – (India)

I
 I Stand Alone (Seul contre tous) – (France)
 I Still Know What You Did Last Summer, starring Jennifer Love Hewitt, Freddie Prinze Jr., Brandy and Mekhi Phifer
 I Want You, directed by Michael Winterbottom, starring Rachel Weisz and Alessandro Nivola – (UK)
 I Went Down, starring Brendan Gleeson – (Ireland)
 Identity Pieces (Pièces d'identités) – (Belgium/France/D.R. Congo)
 The Idiots (Idioterne), directed by Lars von Trier – (Denmark)
 If the Sun Rises in the West (Haega seojjog-eseo tteundamyeon) – (South Korea)
 Illuminata, directed by and starring John Turturro, with Beverly D'Angelo, Susan Sarandon and Christopher Walken
 The Impostors, directed by and starring Stanley Tucci, with Oliver Platt, Alfred Molina, Lili Taylor, Hope Davis, Tony Shalhoub, Billy Connolly and Steve Buscemi
 In God's Hands
 In the Flesh
 Incognito
 The Inheritors (Die Siebtelbauern) – (Austria)
 The Interview, starring Hugo Weaving – (Australia)
 It's a Long Road (Ola einai dromos) – (Greece)

J
 Jack Frost, starring Michael Keaton, Kelly Preston, Joseph Cross and Mark Addy
 Jane Austen's Mafia!, directed by Jim Abrahams starring Jay Mohr, Olympia Dukakis, Christina Applegate and Lloyd Bridges
 Jinnah, starring Christopher Lee, Shashi Kapoor and James Fox – (Pakistan/UK)
 Judas Kiss, starring Alan Rickman, Emma Thompson and Carla Gugino

K
 Khrustalyov, My Car! (Khrustalyov, mashinu!) – (Russia)
 Killer (Tueur à gages) – (Kazakhstan/France)
 Kirikou and the Sorceress (Kirikou et la Sorcière) – (France/Belgium/Luxembourg)
 Kissing a Fool, starring David Schwimmer, Mili Avital and Jason Lee
 Knock Off, starring Jean-Claude Van Damme and Rob Schneider
 Krippendorf's Tribe, starring Richard Dreyfuss, Jenna Elfman and Lily Tomlin
 Kurt & Courtney, directed by Nick Broomfield – (UK)

L
 The Land Girls, directed by David Leland, starring Catherine McCormack, Rachel Weisz and Anna Friel – (UK)
 The Last Days
 The Last Days of Disco, directed by Whit Stillman starring Kate Beckinsale, Chloë Sevigny, Chris Eigeman and Robert Sean Leonard
 Last Night, directed by and starring Don McKellar, with Sandra Oh, Sarah Polley and David Cronenberg – (Canada)
 Leaf on a Pillow (Daun di Atas Bantal) – (Indonesia)
 Left Luggage (2 koffers vol), directed by Jeroen Krabbé, starring Isabella Rossellini – (Netherlands)
 The Legend of 1900 (La leggenda del pianista sull'oceano), directed by Giuseppe Tornatore, starring Tim Roth, Pruitt Taylor Vince, Mélanie Thierry and Bill Nunn – (Italy/US)
 Lethal Weapon 4, directed by Richard Donner, starring Mel Gibson, Danny Glover, Joe Pesci, Rene Russo, Chris Rock and Jet Li
 Life is to Whistle (La Vida es Silbar) – (Cuba)
 The Lighthouse (El Faro) – (Argentina/Spain)
 The Lion King II: Simba's Pride with the voices of Matthew Broderick, Moira Kelly, Neve Campbell, Ernie Sabella and Nathan Lane
 Little Thieves, Big Thieves (100 años de perdón) – (Venezuela)
 Little Tony – (Netherlands)
 Little Voice, directed by Mark Herman, starring Brenda Blethyn, Jane Horrocks, Michael Caine, Jim Broadbent and Ewan McGregor – (UK)
 Living Out Loud, starring Holly Hunter, Danny DeVito and Queen Latifah
 Lock, Stock and Two Smoking Barrels, directed by Guy Ritchie, starring Jason Flemyng, Jason Statham, Dexter Fletcher, Nick Moran, Vinnie Jones and Sting – (UK)
 The Longest Nite (aka Dark Flowers), starring Tony Leung – (Hong Kong)
 Lost in Space, directed by Stephen Hopkins, starring William Hurt, Gary Oldman, Mimi Rogers, Matt LeBlanc, Heather Graham and Lacey Chabert
 Love & Pop (ラブ&ポップ) – (Japan)
 Love from Ground Zero
 Love Is the Devil: Study for a Portrait of Francis Bacon, directed by John Maybury, starring Derek Jacobi, Daniel Craig and Tilda Swinton – (UK)
 Lovers of the Arctic Circle (Los amantes del círculo polar) – (Spain)
 Lucky and Zorba (La gabbianella e il gatto), directed by Enzo D'Alò – (Italy)
 Lulu on the Bridge, starring Harvey Keitel and Mira Sorvino

M
 Madame Blueberry
 Madeline, starring Frances McDormand and Nigel Hawthorne – (US/France)
 Magdalen, directed by Andrew Repasky McElhinney, starring Alix D. Smith, David Semonin, Moria Rankin  (USA)
 Mala Época (Bad Times) – (Argentina)
 Mama Don't Cry (Mama Ne Goryuj) – (Russia)
 The Man in the Iron Mask, directed by Randall Wallace, starring Leonardo DiCaprio, Jeremy Irons, John Malkovich, Gérard Depardieu, Gabriel Byrne – (UK/US)
 The Man with Rain in His Shoes, starring Lena Headey and Penélope Cruz – (Sp/Fr/UK/U.S./Ger)
 The Mask of Zorro, directed by Martin Campbell, starring Antonio Banderas, Anthony Hopkins, Catherine Zeta-Jones and Stuart Wilson
 Meet Joe Black, directed by Martin Brest, starring Brad Pitt, Anthony Hopkins, Claire Forlani, Jake Weber, Jeffrey Tambor, Marcia Gay Harden
 Meeting People Is Easy, featuring Radiohead – (UK)
 Melting Pot
 Mercury Rising, directed by Harold Becker, starring Bruce Willis, Alec Baldwin, Miko Hughes and Kim Dickens
 The Mighty, starring Kieran Culkin, Sharon Stone, Elden Henson, Gena Rowlands, Gillian Anderson
 Mighty Joe Young, directed by Ron Underwood, starring Charlize Theron, Bill Paxton and Rade Šerbedžija
 The Mighty Kong
 Les Misérables, directed by Bille August, starring Liam Neeson, Geoffrey Rush, Uma Thurman and Claire Danes – (Germany/UK/US)
 Montana, starring Kyra Sedgwick and Stanley Tucci
 Monument Ave., starring Denis Leary and Famke Janssen
 Mr. Zhao (Zhào Xiānshēng) – (China)
 Mulan, with the voices of Ming-Na Wen and Eddie Murphy
 Music from Another Room, starring Jude Law and Jennifer Tilly
 The Mutants (Os mutantes) – (Portugal)
 My Giant, starring Billy Crystal
 My Name Is Joe, directed by Ken Loach, starring Peter Mullan – (UK)

N
 The Naked Man, starring Michael Rapaport
 The Negotiator, directed by F. Gary Gray, starring Samuel L. Jackson, Kevin Spacey, David Morse and J. T. Walsh
 New Rose Hotel, directed by Abel Ferrara, starring Christopher Walken, Willem Dafoe, Asia Argento and Annabella Sciorra
 The Newton Boys, directed by Richard Linklater, starring Matthew McConaughey, Ethan Hawke, Skeet Ulrich and Vincent D'Onofrio
 Next Stop Wonderland, starring Hope Davis
 A Night at the Roxbury, starring Will Ferrell and Chris Kattan
 Nô – (Canada)
 No Looking Back, starring Lauren Holly and Jon Bon Jovi

O
 The Object of My Affection, starring Jennifer Aniston and Paul Rudd
 October 22
 The Odd Couple II, starring Walter Matthau and Jack Lemmon
 Of Freaks and Men (Pro urodov i lyudey) – (Russia)
 Okraina (Outskirts) – (Russia)
 One Evening After the War (Un soir apres la guerre) – (Cambodia/France)
 One True Thing, starring Meryl Streep, Renée Zellweger, William Hurt and Tom Everett Scott
 Only Clouds Move the Stars (Bare skyer beveger stjernene) – (Norway)
 The Opposite of Sex, starring Christina Ricci and Lisa Kudrow
 The Other Conquest (La Otra Conquista) – (Mexico)
 Out of Sight, directed by Steven Soderbergh, starring George Clooney, Jennifer Lopez, Don Cheadle, Ving Rhames, Dennis Farina and Albert Brooks
 Outside Ozona, starring Robert Forster, Kevin Pollak and Sherilyn Fenn
 Overnight Delivery, starring Paul Rudd and Reese Witherspoon

P
 Paljas – (South Africa)
 Palmetto, directed by Volker Schlöndorff, starring Woody Harrelson and Elisabeth Shue
 The Parent Trap, starring Dennis Quaid, Natasha Richardson and Lindsay Lohan
 Passion (Szenvedély) – (Hungary)
 Patch Adams, directed by Tom Shadyac, starring Robin Williams, Monica Potter and Philip Seymour Hoffman
 Paulie, starring Tony Shalhoub, Gena Rowlands, Cheech Marin, Jay Mohr and Buddy Hackett
 Pecker, directed by John Waters, starring Edward Furlong, Christina Ricci, Lili Taylor, Martha Plimpton, Mary Kay Place and Bess Armstrong
 Peculiarities of the National Fishing (Osobennosti natsionalnoy rybalki) – (Russia)
 A Perfect Murder, directed by Andrew Davis, starring Michael Douglas, Gwyneth Paltrow, Viggo Mortensen and David Suchet
 Permanent Midnight, starring Ben Stiller, Maria Bello, Elizabeth Hurley, Janeane Garofalo and Owen Wilson
 The Personals (Zheng hun qi shi) – (Taiwan)
 Phantom Beirut (ashbah bayroot) – (Lebanon)
 Phantoms, starring Peter O'Toole, Rose McGowan, Liev Schreiber and Ben Affleck
 Phoenix, starring Ray Liotta and Anjelica Huston
 Pi, directed by Darren Aronofsky, starring Sean Gullette and Mark Margolis
 The Pianist (El pianista) – (Spain)
 A Place Called Chiapas – (Canada)
 Places in Cities (Plätze in Städten) – (Germany)
 Playing by Heart, starring Sean Connery, Gena Rowlands, Jon Stewart
 Pleasantville, directed by Gary Ross, starring Tobey Maguire, Joan Allen, Reese Witherspoon, William H. Macy, Don Knotts, J. T. Walsh and Jeff Daniels
 Pocahontas II: Journey to a New World
 The Polish Bride (De Poolse bruid) – (Netherlands)
 Pokemon: The First Movie (Gekijōban Poketto Monsutā Myūtsū no Gyakushū) - (Japan)
 Poodle Springs (film), starring James Caan, Dina Meyer, David Keith, Brian Cox and Joe Don Baker
 The Power of Kangwon Province (Gangwon-do ui him) – (South Korea)
 Practical Magic, starring Sandra Bullock, Nicole Kidman, Dianne Wiest, Stockard Channing and Aidan Quinn
 A Price Above Rubies, starring Renée Zellweger
 Primary Colors, directed by Mike Nichols, starring John Travolta, Emma Thompson, Billy Bob Thornton, Adrian Lester and Kathy Bates
 The Prince of Egypt, directed by Brenda Chapman, Steve Hickner and Simon Wells, starring Val Kilmer, Ralph Fiennes, Sandra Bullock, Michelle Pfeiffer, Jeff Goldblum, Patrick Stewart, Helen Mirren
 Prometheus, directed by Tony Harrison, starring Walter Sparrow (UK)
 Psycho, directed by Gus Van Sant, starring Vince Vaughn, Anne Heche, Julianne Moore, Viggo Mortensen, William H. Macy and Robert Forster

Q
 Quest for Camelot
 The Quiet Family (Joyonghan Gajok) – (South Korea)

R
 Radiofreccia – (Italy)
 The Rat Pack, directed by Rob Cohen, starring Ray Liotta, Joe Mantegna, Don Cheadle, Angus Macfadyen and Bobby Slayton
 Reach the Rock, starring William Sadler
 The Real Blonde, starring Matthew Modine, Catherine Keener, Daryl Hannah, Maxwell Caulfield, Kathleen Turner and Marlo Thomas
 The Red Violin (Le Violon rouge) – (Canada/Italy/UK)
 The Replacement Killers, directed by Antoine Fuqua, starring Chow Yun-fat, Mira Sorvino and Michael Rooker
 Restaurant, starring Adrien Brody and Lauryn Hill
 The Return of El Coyote
 Return to Paradise, starring Vince Vaughn, Joaquin Phoenix and Anne Heche
 Riddler's Moon
 Ring (Ringu), directed by Hideo Nakata – (Japan)
 Ringmaster, starring Jerry Springer, Jaime Pressly and Molly Hagan
 Ronin, directed by John Frankenheimer, starring Robert De Niro, Jean Reno, Stellan Skarsgård, Jonathan Pryce, Natascha McElhone, Katarina Witt and Sean Bean
 The Rose Seller (La vendedora de rosas) – (Colombia)
 Rounders, directed by John Dahl, starring Matt Damon, Edward Norton, John Turturro, Gretchen Mol, Martin Landau and John Malkovich
 Rudolph the Red-Nosed Reindeer: The Movie, with the voices of John Goodman, Alan Arkin, Eric Idle and Whoopi Goldberg
 The Rugrats Movie
 Run Lola Run (Lola rennt), directed by Tom Tykwer, starring Franka Potente and Moritz Bleibtreu – (Germany) – Golden Space Needle Award (for 1999)
 Rush Hour, directed by Brett Ratner, starring Jackie Chan, Chris Tucker and Tom Wilkinson
 Rushmore, directed by Wes Anderson, starring Jason Schwartzman, Olivia Williams, Bill Murray, Mason Gamble and Seymour Cassel

S
 Safe Men, starring Sam Rockwell and Steve Zahn
 Saving Private Ryan, directed by Steven Spielberg, starring Tom Hanks, Matt Damon, Edward Burns, Dennis Farina, Vin Diesel, Paul Giamatti, Giovanni Ribisi and Ted Danson – Golden Globe Award for Best Picture (Drama)
 Savior, starring Dennis Quaid and Stellan Skarsgård
 The School of Flesh (L'École de la chair), starring Isabelle Huppert – (France)
 Scratches in the Table (Madelief, krassen in het tafelblad) – (Netherlands)
 Sekal Has to Die (Je třeba zabít Sekala) – (Czech Republic)
 Senseless, starring Marlon Wayans and David Spade
 Shadrach, starring Harvey Keitel and Andie MacDowell
 Shakespeare in Love, directed by John Madden, starring Joseph Fiennes, Gwyneth Paltrow, Ben Affleck, Colin Firth and Judi Dench – (UK/US) – Academy and Golden Globe (Mus./Com.) Awards for Best Picture
 The Shoe (Kurpe) – (Latvia)
 Show Me Love (Fucking Åmål) – (Sweden)
 Die Siebtelbauern (The Inheritors) – (Austria)
 The Siege, directed by Edward Zwick, starring Denzel Washington, Annette Bening, Bruce Willis and Tony Shalhoub
 Simon Birch, starring Ian Michael Smith, Joseph Mazzello, Ashley Judd and Oliver Platt
 A Simple Plan, directed by Sam Raimi, starring Billy Bob Thornton, Bill Paxton, Bridget Fonda and Gary Cole
 Sinbad: The Battle of the Dark Knights
 Since You've Been Gone, directed by and starring David Schwimmer, with Teri Hatcher, Jon Stewart, Rachel Griffiths, and Lara Flynn Boyle
 Six Days, Seven Nights, directed by Ivan Reitman, starring Harrison Ford, Anne Heche and David Schwimmer
 Slam
 Sliding Doors, starring Gwyneth Paltrow, John Hannah, John Lynch and Jeanne Tripplehorn  – (UK/US)
 Small Soldiers, directed by Joe Dante, starring Gregory Smith, Kirsten Dunst, Phil Hartman, Kevin Dunn, Ann Magnuson and Denis Leary with the voices of Tommy Lee Jones and Frank Langella
 Smoke Signals – (US/Canada)
 Snake Eyes, directed by Brian De Palma, starring Nicolas Cage, Gary Sinise, Carla Gugino, John Heard and Luis Guzman
 So Close to Paradise (Biandan guniang) – (China)
 Soldier, starring Kurt Russell
 Sour Grapes, directed by Larry David, starring Steven Weber and Craig Bierko
 Species II, starring Natasha Henstridge, Michael Madsen, Marg Helgenberger
 Sphere, directed by Barry Levinson, starring Dustin Hoffman, Sharon Stone, Samuel L. Jackson, Liev Schreiber and Queen Latifah
 Spring in My Hometown (Areumdaoon shijeol) – (South Korea)
 Star Kid
 Star Trek: Insurrection, directed by Jonathan Frakes, starring Patrick Stewart, LeVar Burton, Brent Spiner, Donna Murphy, Gregg Henry and F. Murray Abraham
 State of Dogs (Nokhoin Oron) – (Mongolia)
 Stepmom, directed by Chris Columbus, starring Julia Roberts, Susan Sarandon and Ed Harris
 Still Crazy, starring Stephen Rea, Billy Connolly, Bill Nighy, Jimmy Nail and Timothy Spall – (UK)
 Susan's Plan, directed by John Landis, starring Nastassja Kinski, Billy Zane, Rob Schneider, Lara Flynn Boyle and Dan Aykroyd
 The Swan Princess: The Mystery of the Enchanted Kingdom

T
 Tango, directed by Carlos Saura – (Argentina)
 Taxi – (France)
 The Teenage Textbook Movie – (Singapore)
 Tell Me I'm Dreaming (Dis-moi que je rêve) – (France)
 There's Something About Mary, directed by the Farrelly brothers, starring Ben Stiller, Cameron Diaz, Matt Dillon, Lee Evans and Chris Elliott
 Thick as Thieves, starring Alec Baldwin
 The Thin Red Line, directed by Terrence Malick, starring Sean Penn, Nick Nolte, Jim Caviezel, Adrien Brody, Elias Koteas, Ben Chaplin, Woody Harrelson, John Cusack, John Travolta and George Clooney — Golden Bear Award for 1999
 The Three Men of Melita Žganjer (Tri muškarca Melite Žganjer) – (Croatia)
 Torrente, el brazo tonto de la ley (Torrente, the Dumb Arm of the Law) – (Spain)
 Train of Life (Train de Vie) (Fr/Bel/Neth/Is/Rom)
 Train to Pakistan – (India)
 Trance, starring Alison Elliott, Christopher Walken and Jared Harris
 The Truman Show, directed by Peter Weir, starring Jim Carrey, Laura Linney, Natascha McElhone and Ed Harris
 Twilight, directed by Robert Benton, starring Paul Newman, Gene Hackman, Susan Sarandon, James Garner, Liev Schreiber, Stockard Channing and Reese Witherspoon

U
 U.S. Marshals, starring Tommy Lee Jones, Wesley Snipes and Robert Downey Jr.
 Ultraman Tiga & Ultraman Dyna: Warriors of the Star of Light – (Japan)
 Up 'n' Under – (UK)
 Urban Legend, starring Alicia Witt, Tara Reid and Jared Leto

V
 Vampires, directed by John Carpenter, starring James Woods, Daniel Baldwin, Sheryl Lee, Thomas Ian Griffith and Maximilian Schell
 Velvet Goldmine, directed by Todd Haynes, starring Jonathan Rhys Meyers, Christian Bale, Ewan McGregor, Toni Collette and Eddie Izzard – (UK)
 Very Bad Things, directed by Peter Berg, starring Jon Favreau, Christian Slater, Jeremy Piven, Daniel Stern and Cameron Diaz
 The Very Thought of You, aka Martha, Meet Frank, Daniel and Laurence, starring Monica Potter, Joseph Fiennes and Rufus Sewell – (UK)
 La Vie Sur Terre (Life on Earth) – (Mali/Mauritania)
 The Vivero Letter, starring Fred Ward, Robert Patrick

W
 Waking Ned, aka Waking Ned Devine, starring Ian Bannen, James Nesbitt and Fionnula Flanagan – (UK/France)
 The Waterboy, starring Adam Sandler, Kathy Bates, Henry Winkler and Fairuza Balk
 The Way We Laughed (Così ridevano) – (Italy)
 The Wedding Singer, starring Adam Sandler, Drew Barrymore and Christine Taylor
 Went to Coney Island on a Mission from God... Be Back by Five
 West Beirut (Beyrout al gharbiyya) – (Lebanon)
 What Dreams May Come, directed by Vincent Ward, starring Robin Williams, Cuba Gooding Jr., Annabella Sciorra and Max von Sydow
 When the Dead Start Singing (Kad mrtvi zapjevaju) – (Croatia)
 Whispering Corridors (Yeogogoedam) – (South Korea)
 Who Am I? (Wǒ Shì Shéi), starring Jackie Chan – (Hong Kong)
 Why Do Fools Fall In Love, starring Halle Berry and Vivica A. Fox
 Wide Awake, directed by M. Night Shyamalan, starring Rosie O'Donnell, Dana Delany and Denis Leary
 Wild Things, directed by John McNaughton, starring Denise Richards, Neve Campbell, Kevin Bacon, Matt Dillon and Bill Murray
 Without Limits, directed by Robert Towne, starring Billy Crudup, Donald Sutherland, Monica Potter, Judith Ivey and Matthew Lillard
 The Wonderful Ice Cream Suit, starring Joe Mantegna and Esai Morales
 Woubi Chéri (Darling Woubi) – (Côte d'Ivoire/France)
 Wrongfully Accused, starring Leslie Nielsen, Richard Crenna, Melinda McGraw and Kelly LeBrock

X
 The X-Files, directed by Rob Bowman, starring David Duchovny, Gillian Anderson, Martin Landau and Blythe Danner
 Xiu Xiu: The Sent Down Girl (Tiān Yù), directed by Joan Chen – (China)

Y
 Your Friends & Neighbors, directed by Neil LaBute, starring Amy Brenneman, Aaron Eckhart, Catherine Keener, Nastassja Kinski, Jason Patric and Ben Stiller
 You've Got Mail, directed by Nora Ephron, starring Tom Hanks, Meg Ryan, Parker Posey, Steve Zahn and Greg Kinnear

Z
 Zero Effect, directed by Jake Kasdan, starring Bill Pullman, Ben Stiller, Kim Dickens and Ryan O'Neal

Births
 January 4 - Coco Jones, American actress/singer
 January 5 - Marie Iitoyo, Japanese model and actress
 January 9 - Kerris Dorsey, American actress and singer
 January 12 - Nathan Gamble, American actor
 January 23 - Rachel Crow, American actress/singer and comedian
 January 24 - Ada-Nicole Sanger, American actress
 January 28 - Ariel Winter, American actress
 February 15 - Zachary Gordon, American actor
 February 17 - Fernanda Urdapilleta, Mexican actress
 March 3 - Jayson Tatum, American Basketball Player
 March 22 - Paola Andino, Puerto Rican-American actress
 March 25 - Ryan Simpkins, American actor
 April 6 - Peyton List, American actress
 April 9
Elle Fanning, American actress
Lil Woods, British actress
 April 24 - Ryan Newman, American actress
 April 30 - Olivia DeJonge, Australian actress
 May 1 - Grayson Russell, American actor
 May 24 - Daisy Edgar-Jones, English actress
 May 29 - Shealeigh, American singer
 June 11 - Charlie Tahan, American actor
 June 15 - Rachel Covey, American actress
 June 19
 Suzu Hirose, Japanese actress
 Atticus Shaffer, American actor
 June 27 - Sistine Stallone, American actress and model
 July 7 - Dylan Sprayberry, American actor
 July 8
Maya Hawke, American actress
Jaden Smith, American actor
 July 9 - Robert Capron, American actor
 July 22 - Madison Pettis, American actress
 July 24
Bindi Irwin, Australian actress
Cailee Spaeny, American actress
 July 27 - Myles Erlick, Canadian actor and singer
 July 28 - Sasha Meneghel, Brazilian actress
 July 31 - Rico Rodriguez, American actor
 August 1 - Khamani Griffin, American actor
 August 3 - Cozi Zuehlsdorff, American actress and singer
 August 5 - Mimi Keene, English actress
 August 6 - Forrest Goodluck, American actor
 August 8 - Shawn Mendes, Canadian singer
 August 21 - Jade Chynoweth, American actress
 August 25 - China Anne McClain, American actress and singer
 September 2 - Choi Ye-bin, South Korean actress
 September 5 - Helena Barlow, English actress
 October 1
Isabella Amara, American actress and singer
Danika Yarosh, American actress
 October 17 - Erin Kellyman, English actress
 October 23 - Amandla Stenberg, American actress
 October 28 - Nolan Gould, American actor
 November 7 - Octavio Ocaña, Mexican actor (died 2021)
 November 13 - Gattlin Griffith, American actor
 November 23 - Bradley Steven Perry, American actor
 December 2
Amber Montana, American actress
Celeste O'Connor, Kenyan-born American actor
 December 15 - Chandler Canterbury, American former child actor
 December 23 - G Hannelius, American actress and singer
 December 29 - Paris Berelc, American actress

Deaths

Film debuts
Elizabeth Banks – Surrender Dorothy
Kristen Bell – Polish Wedding
Kate Bosworth – The Horse Whisperer
Jim Breuer – Half Baked
Jordana Brewster – The Faculty
Louis C.K. – Tomorrow Night
Adam Carolla – Too Smooth
Lacey Chabert – Lost in Space
Taye Diggs – How Stella Got Her Groove Back
Snoop Dogg – Half Baked
Cedric the Entertainer – Ride
Vera Farmiga – Return to Paradise
Craig Ferguson – Modern Vampires
Anna Friel – The Stringer
Judy Greer – Kissing a Fool
Josh Hartnett – Halloween H20: 20 Years Later
Anthony Hayes – The Boys
Taraji P. Henson – Streetwise
Kate Hudson – Desert Blue
Oscar Isaac – Illtown
Vinnie Jones – Lock, Stock and Two Smoking Barrels
Chris Kattan – A Night at the Roxbury
Shia LaBeouf – The Christmas Path
Lindsay Lohan – The Parent Trap
Matt Lucas – Jilting Joe
Eva Mendes – A Night at the Roxbury
Cillian Murphy – The Tale of Sweety Barrett
Christopher Nolan (director) – Following
Amy Poehler – Tomorrow Night
Rebecca Romijn – Dirty Work
Mike Schatz – Major League: Back to the Minors
Jason Schwartzman – Rushmore
Jason Segel – Can't Hardly Wait
Dax Shepard – Hairshirt
Jason Statham – Lock, Stock and Two Smoking Barrels
Wanda Sykes – Tomorrow Night
Usher – The Faculty
Denis Villeneuve (director) – August 32nd on Earth
Matt Walsh – Tomorrow Night
Shea Whigham – Of Love & Fantasy
Jaleel White – Quest for Camelot

References

 
Film by year